Multifocal fibrosclerosis and idiopathic fibrosclerosis are disorders of unknown aetiology, characterised by fibrous lesions (co-)occurring at a variety of sites. Known manifestations include retroperitoneal fibrosis, mediastinal fibrosis and Riedel's thyroiditis.

They are now considered to be manifestations of IgG4-related disease.

References

External links 

IgG4-related disease
Idiopathic diseases